Boros is a genus of conifer bark beetles in the family Boridae. There are at least two described species in Boros.

Species
These two species belong to the genus Boros:
 Boros schneideri (Panzer, 1795) g
 Boros unicolor Say, 1827 i c g b
Data sources: i = ITIS, c = Catalogue of Life, g = GBIF, b = Bugguide.net

References

Further reading

External links

 

Tenebrionoidea
Articles created by Qbugbot
Tenebrionoidea genera